Nicolas Müller (born 24 August 1989, in Winterthur) is a professional squash player who represents Switzerland. He reached a career-high ranking of World No. 17 in December 2014. He became the first Swiss squash player to reach the 20th place in the world ranking, in 2012.

References

External links 
 
 

Swiss male squash players
Living people
1989 births
People from Winterthur
Sportspeople from the canton of Zürich